

Parry is a lunar impact crater that is attached to the southeast rim of the walled plain Fra Mauro. It was named after British explorer William Parry. Attached to the west and southwest rim of Parry is the crater Bonpland. Due south of Parry is the small crater Tolansky, and farther to the south-southwest is Guericke.

The rim of Parry is heavily worn and slightly distorted due to the co-joined formations. The wall is the most prominent along the northwest, and crossed along the southwest by the small Parry B. The floor has been flooded by lava, and is relatively flat. At the midpoint is a pair of small craters. 

A rille system, called the Rimae Parry, crosses the region in a series of graben.  One rille crosses the southeast rim of Parry in a northeast direction before crossing the east rim and continuing a short distance across the surrounding mare.  Another extends from Tolansky crater across the west side of Parry and into Fra Mauro crater.  One other crosses the north rim of Bonpland crater and into Fra Mauro where it intersects with another rille.

Satellite craters

By convention these features are identified on lunar maps by placing the letter on the side of the crater midpoint that is closest to Parry.

The following craters have been renamed by the IAU.
 Parry A — See Tolansky (crater).

References

External links

 Parry at The Moon Wiki
 Rimae Parry at The Moon Wiki

Impact craters on the Moon